Lyubov Konstantinovna Sliska (born October 15, 1953, in Saratov, Soviet Union, as Lyubov Timoshina) is a Russian politician.

Career
Since January 2000, she has been a deputy of the State Duma and a First Deputy Speaker of it (Unity and later United Russia faction).

When the city's council of the Ukrainian town Stryi decided on April 9, 2009 to remove a Soviet-era statue to the Red Army soldier and move it to a museum of Soviet totalitarianism, saying the statue had no historical or cultural value. Sliska stated such decisions could only be made by a "criminal regime." "They have long turned a blind eye to Nazi marches, portraying those who massacred people as heroes," Sliska said, adding the decision revealed lawmakers` disrespect for the soldiers who liberated Ukraine.

References

External links 
 Школа злословия с участием Любови Слиски

Living people
21st-century Russian politicians
21st-century Russian women politicians
1953 births
Recipients of the Order "For Merit to the Fatherland", 4th class
Recipients of the Order of Honour (Russia)
Fifth convocation members of the State Duma (Russian Federation)
Third convocation members of the State Duma (Russian Federation)
Fourth convocation members of the State Duma (Russian Federation)
Russian jurists
Actors from Saratov